Kasala is a 2018 Nigerian comedy drama film directed by Ema Edosio. The film stars Gabriel Afolayan, Judith Audu, Emeka Nwagbaraocha, Jide Kosoko and Sambasa Nzeribe. The film was released on October 12 2018 but was only accepted to the cinema by December 2018 and premiered on Netflix on January 31, 2020.

Plot 
The theme of the film revolves around a boy Tunji (Emeka Nwagbaraocha) a quick talking young person, who along with his friends Chikodi, Effiong and Abraham got his Uncle's vehicle to move along the street on a Joyride. But things go bad when they crash the vehicle and have just 5 hours to raise the necessary assets to fix the vehicle before Tunji's Uncle returns from work.

Cast 
 Emeka Nwagbaraocha as Tunji
 Tomiwa Tegbe as Effiong
 Chimezie Imo as Abraham
 Kassim Abiodun as Tunji's Uncle
 Jide Kosoko as Uncle's Boss
 Gabriel Afolayan as Laundryman
 Mike Afolarin as Chikodi

References

External links 
 
 

English-language Nigerian films